The 1901 South Carolina 7th congressional district special election was held on November 5, 1901 to select a Representative for the 7th congressional district to serve out the remainder of the term for the 57th Congress.  The special election resulted from the death of Representative J. William Stokes on July 6, 1901.  Asbury Francis Lever, a former secretary to Stokes, won the Democratic primary and was unopposed in the general election.

Democratic primary
The South Carolina Democratic Party held their primary in the summer of 1901.  Five candidates entered the race and among those who sought the seat was future longtime U.S. Senator, Ellison D. Smith.  Asbury Francis Lever emerged atop the first primary election and won the runoff election against Thomas F. Brantley, a candidate in the 1898 election.  There was no opposition to the Democratic candidate in the general election so Lever was elected to serve out the remainder of the term.

General election results

|-
| 
| colspan=5 |Democratic hold
|-

See also
South Carolina's 7th congressional district
List of special elections to the United States House of Representatives in South Carolina

References

"Report of M.R. Cooper, Secretary of State, to the General Assembly of South Carolina." Reports and Resolutions of the General Assembly of the State of South Carolina. Volume II. Columbia, SC: The State Company, 1902, pp. 1995–1996.

South Carolina 1901 07
South Carolina 1901 07
1901 07
South Carolina 07
United States House of Representatives 07
United States House of Representatives 1901 07
Single-candidate elections